Padilla is a town and municipality in the Cauca Department, Colombia.

Municipalities of Cauca Department